was a Japanese ethnologist and Japanologist.

Biography
He was born in Matsumoto, Nagano Prefecture. He was a graduate of the University of Tokyo and Tohoku University. He served on the faculty of Meiji University, Kanagawa Dental University, Wayo Women's University, Tokyo Metropolitan University and Tokyo University of Foreign Studies.

He died on 15 December 1982 in Tokyo.

References

1898 births
1982 deaths
People from Matsumoto, Nagano
University of Tokyo alumni
Tohoku University alumni
Academic staff of Meiji University
Academic staff of Kanagawa Dental University
Academic staff of Wayo Women's University
Academic staff of Tokyo Metropolitan University
Academic staff of Tokyo University of Foreign Studies
Ethnologists
Japanologists